A test tube, also known as a culture tube or sample tube, is a common piece of laboratory glassware consisting of a finger-like length of glass or clear plastic tubing, open at the top and closed at the bottom.

Test tubes are usually placed in special-purpose racks.

Types and usage

Chemistry

Test tubes intended for general chemical work are usually made of glass, for its relative resistance to heat. Tubes made from expansion-resistant glasses, mostly borosilicate glass or fused quartz, can withstand high temperatures up to several hundred degrees Celsius.

Chemistry tubes are available in a multitude of lengths and widths, typically from 10 to 20 mm wide and 50 to 200 mm long. The top often features a flared lip to aid pouring out the contents.

A chemistry test tube typically has a flat bottom, a round bottom, or a conical bottom. Some test tubes are made to accept a ground glass stopper or a screw cap.  They are often provided with a small ground glass or white glaze area near the top for labelling with a pencil.

Test tubes are widely used by chemists to handle chemicals, especially for qualitative experiments and assays. Their spherical bottom and vertical sides reduce mass loss when pouring, make them easier to wash out, and allow convenient monitoring of the contents.  The long, narrow neck of test tube slows down the spreading of gases to the environment.

Test tubes are convenient containers for heating small amounts of liquids or solids with a Bunsen burner or alcohol burner. The tube is usually held by its neck with a clamp or tongs.  By tilting the tube, the bottom can be heated to hundreds of degrees in the flame, while the neck remains relatively cool, possibly allowing vapours to condense on its walls. A boiling tube is a large test tube intended specifically for boiling liquids.

A test tube filled with water and upturned into a water-filled beaker is often used to capture gases, e.g. in electrolysis demonstrations.

A test tube with a stopper is often used for temporary storage of chemical or biological samples.

Biosciences
Culture tubes are test tubes used in biology and related sciences for handling and culturing all kinds of live organisms, such as molds, bacteria, seedlings, plant cuttings, etc..  Some racks for culture tubes are designed to hold the tubes in a nearly horizontal position, so as to maximize the surface of the culture medium inside.

Culture tubes for biology are usually made of clear plastic (such as polystyrene or polypropylene) by injection molding and are often discarded after use. Plastic test tubes with a screwtop cap are often called "Falcon tubes" after a line manufactured by Becton Dickinson.

Some sources consider that the presence of a lip is what distinguishes a test tube from a culture tube.

Clinical medicine
In clinical medicine, sterile test tubes with air removed, called vacutainers, are used to collect and hold samples of physiological fluids such as blood, urine, pus, and synovial fluid.  These tubes are commonly sealed with a rubber stopper and often have a specific additive placed in the tube with the stopper color indicating the additive.  For example, a blue-top tube is a 5 ml test tube containing sodium citrate as an anticoagulant, used to collect blood for coagulation and glucose-6-phosphate dehydrogenase testing. Small vials used in medicine may have a snap-top (also called a hinge cap) molded as part of the vial.

Other uses

Test tubes are sometimes put to casual uses outside of lab environments, e.g. as flower vases, glassware for certain weak shots, or containers for spices. They can also be used for raising queen ants during their first months of development.

Variants

Boiling tube 
A boiling tube is a small cylindrical vessel used to strongly heat substances in the flame of a Bunsen burner. A boiling tube is essentially a scaled-up test tube, being about 50% larger.

They are designed to be wide enough to allow substances to boil violently as opposed to a test tube, which is too narrow; a boiling liquid can explode out of the end of test tubes when they are heated, as there is no room for bubbles of gas to escape independently of the surrounding liquid. This phenomenon is called bumping.

Ignition tube 

An ignition tube is used in much the same way as a boiling tube, except it is not as large and thick-walled. It is primarily used to hold small quantities of substances which are undergoing direct heating by a Bunsen burner or other heat source. This type of tube is used in the sodium fusion test.

Ignition tubes are often difficult to clean due to the small bore. When used to heat substances strongly, some char may stick to the walls as well. They are usually disposable.

See also
 Test tube holder
 Test tube brush
 Microtiter plate

References 

Laboratory glassware
Containers